Helme is a small village in the Kirklees district, in the county of West Yorkshire, England. It is near the town of Meltham and Blackmoorfoot Reservoir. Helme, constituted in 1858, was part of Almondbury parish in the 19th century. 


Amenities 
The local primary school is Helme Church of England Academy. Christ Church on Slades Lane, designed by James Pigott Pritchett and consecrated in November 1859, is a Grade II listed building.

Nearby Helme Hall, built in the late 19th century, is now a nursing and residential home for the elderly.

See also
Listed buildings in Meltham

References

Villages in West Yorkshire
Geography of Kirklees